Margarita del Sagrado Corazón de Jesús Chávez Murguía (born 5 June 1959) is a Mexican architect and politician affiliated with the National Action Party. She served as Deputy of the LVII and LIX Legislatures of the Mexican Congress as a plurinominal representative.

References

1959 births
Living people
People from Uruapan
Artists from Michoacán
Mexican architects
Women members of the Chamber of Deputies (Mexico)
Members of the Chamber of Deputies (Mexico)
National Action Party (Mexico) politicians
Universidad Autónoma Metropolitana alumni
20th-century Mexican politicians
20th-century Mexican women politicians
21st-century Mexican politicians
21st-century Mexican women politicians
Deputies of the LIX Legislature of Mexico